In enzymology, a muconolactone Δ-isomerase is an enzyme that catalyzes the chemical reaction

(S)-5-oxo-2,5-dihydrofuran-2-acetate  5-oxo-4,5-dihydrofuran-2-acetate

Hence, this enzyme has one substrate, (S)-5-oxo-2,5-dihydrofuran-2-acetate, and one product, 5-oxo-4,5-dihydrofuran-2-acetate.

This enzyme belongs to the family of isomerases, specifically those intramolecular oxidoreductases transposing C=C bonds.  The systematic name of this enzyme class is 5-oxo-4,5-dihydrofuran-2-acetate Delta3-Delta2-isomerase. This enzyme is also called muconolactone isomerase.  This enzyme participates in benzoate degradation via hydroxylation.

Structural studies

As of late 2007, only one structure has been solved for this class of enzymes, with the PDB accession code .

References 

 
 

EC 5.3.3
Enzymes of known structure